Ji Xin (died 204 BC) was a general serving Liu Bang (later Emperor Gaozu of Han) during the Chu–Han contention.

In the summer of 204 BC, Liu Bang was besieged in the city of Xingyang by the much larger forces of Xiang Yu. After a month in the seemingly desperate situation, Ji Xin came up with a plan and volunteered to act as a decoy to help his lord escape. Ji Xin rode out of the city in Liu Bang's distinctive chariot, pretended to be Liu and offered to surrender. It took Xiang Yu some time to realize that he had been fooled, and when he discovered that the real Liu Bang had already escaped, had Ji Xin burnt to death.

He was later enshrined as the City God of Zhengzhou and Xingyang which was the town he saved.

See also
 , the temple dedicated to him in Zhengzhou City, built no later than 1501(14th year of Hongzhi era, Ming dynasty).

References
 Siege of Xingyang, 204 BC

204 BC deaths
Chu–Han contention people
Year of birth unknown
People executed by China by burning
3rd-century BC executions
Executed Chinese people